Jam Awais Bijar Khan Jokhio is a Pakistani politician who has been a member of the Provincial Assembly of Sindh since August 2018.

Early life and education
He was born on 12 January 1982 and did BA.

Political career

He was elected to the Provincial Assembly of Sindh as a candidate of Pakistan Peoples Party from Constituency PS-79 (Thatta-III) in 2018 Pakistani general election.

Murder
He and his brother Jam Abdul Karim Bijar tortured and murdered a local journalist Nazim Jokhio on 3 November 2021. Reportedly, the 27-year-old victim tried to stop the guests of Jokhio from hunting houbara bustard in Thatta. FIR was registered against Jokhio and he was taken into police custody. He, along with 7 of his servants and guards, were indicted by a Karachi sessions court on 10 December 2022, Bijar plead not guilty to the charges and would contest them.

References

Living people
1982 births
Jamote people
Pakistan People's Party MPAs (Sindh)
Pakistani murderers